KILR may refer to:

 KILR (AM), a radio station (1070 AM) licensed to Estherville, Iowa, United States
 KILR-FM, a radio station (95.9 FM) licensed to Estherville, Iowa, United States